The Martyrs of Nowogródek, also known as the Blessed Martyrs of Nowogródek and the Eleven Nuns of Nowogródek or Blessed Mary Stella and her Ten Companions were a group of members of the Sisters of the Holy Family of Nazareth, a Polish Roman Catholic religious congregation, executed by the Gestapo in August 1943 in occupied Poland (present-day Navahrudak, Belarus). They have been declared Blessed by virtue of martyrdom by Pope John Paul II on 5 March 2000.

Background 
The Sisters of the Holy Family of Nazareth had arrived in Nowogródek, then part of the Second Polish Republic, in 1929 at the request of Zygmunt Łoziński, Bishop of the Roman Catholic Diocese of Pinsk. The Sisters became an integral part of the life of the town. In 1939, Nowogrodek, located at that time in Kresy-part of pre-war Poland (nowadays central Belarus), was annexed by the Soviet Union and incorporated into the Belarusian Soviet Socialist Republic. In 1941, the town was occupied by the German army as part of the Operation Barbarossa.

During the Nazi and Soviet occupations of Nowogrodek, the Sisters invested great effort in preparing the residents of the town for religious services – as liturgical prayer became a beacon of hope amid the hopelessness of the occupation.

The Nazi terror in Nowogródek began in 1942 with the extermination of the town's Jewish population as part of Operation Reinhard. Of the 20,000 inhabitants of the town before the war, approximately half were Jews. The Germans murdered about 9,500 of the Jews in a series of "actions" and sent the remaining 550 Jews to slave labor camps. This was followed by a surge in Polish arrests, then the slaughter of 60 people, including two Catholic priests. This situation was repeated on 18 July 1943, when more than 120 people were arrested and slated for execution.

The women of the town turned to the Sisters to pray for the prisoners' release. After discussing the matter, the Sisters unanimously expressed their desire to offer their lives in sacrifice for the prisoners. The Superior of the community, Sister Maria Stella, C.S.F.N., shared the Sisters' decision with their local pastor, Father Zienkiewicz, telling him: "My God, if sacrifice of life is needed, accept it from us and spare those who have families. We are even praying for this intention." Almost immediately, the plans for the prisoners were changed to deportation to work camps in Germany, with some of them even being released. When the life of Zienkiewicz was threatened, the Sisters renewed their offer, saying, "There is a greater need for a priest on this earth than for us. We pray that God will take us in his place, if sacrifice of life is needed."

Execution 
Without warning or provocation, on 31 July 1943, the community was summoned by the local Gestapo commander to report to the local police station, where they were held overnight. The next morning, 1 August 1943, they were loaded into a van and driven beyond the town limits. At a secluded spot in the woods about 3 miles from the town, the eleven women were machine gunned to death and buried in a common grave. Before reporting to the police station, Sister Stella had asked one member of the community, Sister M. Malgorzata Banas, C.S.F.N., who worked as a nurse in the local public hospital, to stay behind at the convent, whatever happened, to take care of the church and their pastor. She was the best candidate for that among the community as she wore civilian clothing due to her job. It was days before she and the townspeople knew that the Sisters had been killed. Eventually, Banas located their grave, quietly tending to it and the parish church during the war years and during the post-war Soviet occupation, until her death in 1966. The Church of the Transfiguration, known as Biała Fara (or White Church), now contains the remains of the eleven Sisters.

Martyrs 
The eleven murdered Sisters are listed below, along with their birth names, dates of birth, and ages at the time of their deaths.

Veneration 
The beatification process for the eleven Religious Sisters was officially opened on 18 September 1991, and, on 28 June 1999, it was announced by the Congregation for the Causes of Saints of the Holy See that Pope John Paul II had confirmed that they were martyrs, having died for others in the name of the Catholic faith. Pope John Paul formally beatified them, along with a group of thirty-three others, on 5 March 2000.

See also 
 108 Martyrs of World War II

References

External links
 Address of Pope John Paul II to the pilgrims who came to Rome for the Beatification Ceremonies

19th-century births
20th-century births
1943 deaths
20th-century Polish Roman Catholic nuns
Executed Polish people
People executed by Nazi Germany by firing squad
Martyred groups
Massacres of women
Navahrudak
Nazi war crimes in Poland
Nazi war crimes in Belarus
Reichskommissariat Ostland
Mass murder in 1943
20th-century venerated Christians
Polish beatified people
Catholic saints and blesseds of the Nazi era
Beatifications by Pope John Paul II
Lists of Christian martyrs
History of women in Poland
History of women in Belarus